Pope Michael VI of Alexandria, was the 92nd Pope of Alexandria and Patriarch of the See of St. Mark.

15th-century Coptic Orthodox popes of Alexandria
1478 deaths